Oncideres maculosus is a species of beetle in the family Cerambycidae. It was described by Redtenbacher in 1868. It is known from Brazil.

References

maculosus
Beetles described in 1868